Homeland is the seventh studio album by Laurie Anderson, released in 2010. A loose concept album about life in the United States. It was her first album of new material since 2001's Life on a String.

The record was produced by Anderson, Lou Reed and Roma Baran. Anderson began touring the project in late 2007. The album was originally slated for release in 2008. Because the project kept changing in form, the release was pushed back several times. The final release in 2010 was a two-disc set consisting of a CD of music and a DVD.

The song "Only an Expert" was released as a 12" vinyl single on May 18, 2010. A song titled "Pictures and Things" was the single's B-side.

The album's last track "Flow" was nominated for the Grammy Award for Best Pop Instrumental Performance in 2011.

Critical reception 

Nina Power, previewing the album in The Wire magazine, claimed that Homeland "reminds us why Anderson, now in her sixties, is the (modulated) voice of America's conscience."

Margaret Wappler of The Los Angeles Times wrote of the album, "'Homeland' isn't so much an album as it is a poetic capturing of the still moments of a restless mind".

Track listing

Personnel 
 Laurie Anderson – vocals, keyboards, percussion, violin (on tracks 3, 7, 12), radio (9)
 Peter Scherer – keyboards
 Rob Burger – keyboards (2-5, 8, 9), orchestron (2-3, 8), accordion (3, 4, 9, 10), marxophone (4)
 Eyvind Kang – viola
 Tuvan group Chirgilchin (Aidysmaa Koshkendey, Igor Koshkendey, Mongoun-Ool Ondar) – vocals (1, 11), igil (1)
 Lou Reed – additional percussion (2), guitar (5)
 Antony Hegarty – vocals (4), background vocals (7)
 Shahzad Ismaily – percussion (4)
 Kieran Hebden – keyboards (5)
 Omar Hakim – drums (5)
 Skúli Sverrisson – bass (7, 9), guitar (8)
 Ben Wittman – drums, percussion (7)
 John Zorn – alto saxophone (8, 11)
 Lolabelle – piano (8)
 Joey Baron – drums (9)
 Mario J. McNulty – percussion (11)
Technical
 Produced by Laurie Anderson with Lou Reed and Roma Baran
 Engineered by Laurie Anderson, Patrick Dillett, Mario J. McNulty and Marc Urselli
 Mixed by Mario J. McNulty
 Mastered by Scott Hull at Masterdisk, New York, NY
Andrew Zuckerman - cover photography

DVD
Directed by Braden King
Produced by Katie Stern Truckstop Media

Charts 

Album

References

Laurie Anderson albums
2010 albums
Albums produced by Lou Reed
Nonesuch Records albums